The Hall Air Yacht was a 2-seat, tandem, sesquiplane, flying boat, designed and built in the United States in 1923. The Air Yacht was Charles Ward Hall's first attempt at building an aircraft with his company Charles Ward Hall Inc. of Mamaroneck NY. Hall, and his later company Hall Aluminum Aircraft Corp., which would develop manufacturing processes for riveted aluminum alloy aircraft structures in the US. (Charles Ward Hall is not to be confused with Charles Martin Hall, the founder of Alcoa.)

Specifications (Air Yacht)

References

Further reading

External links

1920s United States aircraft
Aircraft first flown in 1923
Sesquiplanes
Flying boats